Steven William "Stove" King (born 8 January 1974 in Ellesmere Port, Cheshire) is an English musician, formerly the bassist for the rock band Mansun.
 
King formed Mansun with Paul Draper, with whom he shared an interest in graphic design. His first bass was an Aria Pro, which he bought to rehearse with Draper – the pair would play along to drum loops in their bedrooms. Having not picked up an instrument prior to the formation of Mansun, King went on to become a solid bass player, with Bassist Magazine commenting in 1997 that despite being a relative newcomer to the instrument and being self-deprecating in interviews, "Stove and Mansun drummer Andie Rathbone have formed a pretty solid bond in the rhythm department".

King also became a pivotal member of Mansun in terms of promoting the band. At one point, he operated an answerphone (nicknamed the Mansaphone – the phone number to which was printed on all the band's releases) installed in his house to update fans on news and also receive messages from them.
 
King left the band in late 2002 after several recording sessions for the album that was eventually released as Kleptomania, leading to the band's split.

It is claimed that the nickname Stove comes from a typo on his birth certificate, which read "Stove" instead of "Steve".

References

1974 births
Living people
English rock bass guitarists
Male bass guitarists
People from Ellesmere Port
21st-century English bass guitarists
21st-century British male musicians